Galega, goat's rue, is a genus of flowering plants in the legume family, Fabaceae, native to central and southern Europe, western Asia and tropical east Africa. They are tall, bushy, herbaceous perennials with erect racemes of pea-like flowers in shades of white, pink, blue or mauve.  Their preferred habitats are sunny damp meadows or slopes.

The species Galega officinalis and Galega orientalis are familiar in cultivation. Numerous cultivars and garden hybrids have also been produced, of which G. × hartlandii 'Lady Wilson' (bicoloured blue and white) and the white-flowered G. × hartlandii 'Alba' have both gained the Royal Horticultural Society's Award of Garden Merit.

There are about 6 to 8 species in the genus.

Species include:
Galega albiflora
Galega battiscombei
Galega lindblomii
Galega officinalis - goat's rue, professor-weed
Galega orientalis - fodder galega

References

Galegeae
Fabaceae genera